|}

This is a list of electoral district results for the 1979 Victoria, Australia, election.

Results by electoral district

Albert Park

Ascot Vale

Ballarat North

Ballarat South

Balwyn

Benalla

Benambra

Bendigo

Bennettswood

Bentleigh

Berwick

Box Hill

Brighton

Broadmeadows

Brunswick

Bundoora

Burwood

Carrum

Caulfield

Coburg

Dandenong

Doncaster

Dromana

Essendon

Evelyn

Footscray

Forest Hill

Frankston

Geelong East

Geelong North

Geelong West

Gippsland East

Gippsland South

Gisborne

Glenhuntly

Glenroy

Greensborough

Hawthorn

Heatherton

Ivanhoe

Keilor

Kew

Knox

Lowan

Malvern

Melbourne

Mentone

Midlands

Mildura

Mitcham

Monbulk

Morwell

Murray Valley

Narracan

Niddrie

Noble Park

Northcote

Oakleigh

Polwarth

Portland

Prahran

Preston

Reservoir

Richmond

Ringwood

Ripon

Rodney

St Kilda

Sandringham

Shepparton

South Barwon

Springvale

Sunshine

Swan Hill 

 The two candidate preferred vote was not counted between the Liberal and National candidates for Swan Hill.

Syndal

Wantirna

Warrandyte

Warrnambool

Werribee

Westernport

Williamstown

See also 

 1979 Victorian state election
 Members of the Victorian Legislative Assembly, 1979–1982

References 

Results of Victorian state elections
1970s in Victoria (Australia)